Esther Jolobala is a Malawian politician who has served in the Parliament of Malawi since 2014, representing the Machinga East constituency as a member of the United Democratic Front.

Political career 
Esther Jolobala was born in the town of Nayuchi in the Machinga District of Malawi.

In the 2014 Malawian general election, Jolobala was elected to represent the Machinga East constituency as an independent in the National Assembly of Malawi. At some point after her election, Jolobala switched parties to the United Democratic Front, which sat in government due to an electoral alliance with the ruling Democratic Progressive Party. Jolobala was re-elected in the 2019 Malawian general election, receiving 23,363 votes; her next closest opponent, Thomas Kenneth Kamu of the DPP, received 6,025 votes.

, Jolobala is a member of the Natural Resources and Climate Change Committee and serves as the Shadow Minister of Gender in the opposition. She was previously a member of the Rural and Local Development Committee and the HIV/AIDS and Nutrition Committee, serving as vice chair of the latter. Additionally, Jolobala is a member of the Parliamentary Women's Caucus and the Parliamentary Conservation Caucus. In March 2022, she served as one of Malawi's representatives to the 144th assembly of the Inter-Parliamentary Union.

During her tenure in parliament, Jolobala has served an advocate for the improvement of Malawi's infrastructure and roads. In December 2018, Jolobala alleged that the DPP government was prioritizing road projects in DPP constituencies in spite of failing infrastructure in the rest of the country. In 2021, she stated that the Nayuchi-Nsanama road had become so heavily damaged that residents were forced to rely on a twice-a-week train in order to conduct business or to receive healthcare, as even ambulances were unable to traverse the road. Jolobala supported a 2022 emergency power restoration bill which allowed the government to borrow funds from the International Development Association in order to repair the Kapichira Hydroelectric Power Station, which had been damaged by Tropical Storm Ana. Later that year, she sided with the Malawi Congress Party government regarding immigration, stating that an influx of unskilled foreign nationals were taking jobs from Malawian workers. During her tenure, Jolobala has also supported increasing the number of polling places in rural constituencies, and advocated for the removal of a surtax on internet services, stating that the tax makes internet unaffordable for a majority of Malawians.

Jolobala is also a prominent opponent of the persecution of albinos. She has decried attacks and kidnappings of albinos, and criticized the Malawi Police Service for delayed or limited responses to crimes against albinos. In 2016, she introduced a bill which would increase the penalties of crimes against albinos, though the bill was not ultimately drafted by the Ministry of Justice.

On 9 December 2019, during an argument with a Machinga District Commissioner regarding the distribution of water pumps, Jolobala grabbed the commissioner by the necktie and forced him against a wall. Jolobala was arrested and charged with breaching the peace the following day.

References 

Place of birth missing (living people)
Year of birth missing (living people)
People from Machinga District
United Democratic Front (Malawi) politicians
21st-century Malawian politicians
21st-century Malawian women politicians
Members of the National Assembly (Malawi)
Delegates to the Inter-Parliamentary Union Assembly
Living people